The 2009 LA Tennis Open (also known as the LA Tennis Open presented by Farmers Insurance Group for sponsorship reasons) was a tennis tournament played on outdoor hard courts. It was the 83rd edition of the event known that year as the LA Tennis Open and was part of the ATP World Tour 250 series of the 2009 ATP World Tour. It took place at the Los Angeles Tennis Center in Los Angeles, United States, from July 27 through August 2, 2009. The LA Tennis Open was the second ATP stop of the 2009 US Open Series.

In addition to the singles and doubles events, a Legends Invitational Singles competition was held, featuring Michael Chang, Stefan Edberg and Jim Courier, winner of the competition at the 2008 Countrywide Classic. The LA Tennis Open kicked off with the "Millennium Challenge" featuring Pete Sampras returning to the University of California, Los Angeles (UCLA) to play Marat Safin in a rematch of their 2000 US Open final, won by the Russian 6–4, 6–3, 6–3. Fourteen-time Grand Slam champion Sampras, who held the World No. 1 ranking for a record 286 weeks, was recognized as the 2009 LA Tennis Open Tournament Honoree.

ATP entrants

Seeds

*Seedings based on the July 20, 2009 rankings.

Other entrants
The following players received wildcards into the singles main draw
  Taylor Dent
  Jesse Levine
  Chris Guccione

The following players received special exemptions into the singles main draw
  Robby Ginepri
  Frank Dancevic

The following players received entry from the qualifying draw:
  Josselin Ouanna
  Carsten Ball
  Ryan Sweeting
  Somdev Devvarman

Finals

Singles

 Sam Querrey defeated  Carsten Ball, 6–4, 3–6, 6–1
It was Querrey's first title of the year and second of his career.

Doubles

 Bob Bryan /  Mike Bryan defeated  Benjamin Becker /  Frank Moser, 6–4, 7–6(7–2)

References

 
LA Tennis Open
Los Angeles Open (tennis)
LA Tennis Open
LA Tennis Open
LA Tennis Open
LA Tennis Open
LA Tennis Open